Kunggar or Maizhokunggar  is a small town and seat of Maizhokunggar County in the Lhasa Prefecture in the Tibet Autonomous Region of China. It is especially noted for its pottery, which non-corrodible, heat retaining and in an ethnic style. It has a more-than-1000-year-old history.

See also
List of towns and villages in Tibet

References

Populated places in Lhasa (prefecture-level city)
Township-level divisions of Tibet
Maizhokunggar County